The male first name Natalis may refer to one of the following saints:

Natalis of Ulster, Irish monk, died 564.
Natalis of Milan, bishop of Milan in 8th century
Antonius Natalis, Ancient Roman conspirator